Call of the Wild is Wild Willy Barrett's first solo album. It was released in 1979 on the Polydor record label.

Track list

Personnel 

 Wild Willy Barrett - vocals, guitar, violin, bass
 Martin Freeman - drums
 Yvonne Grech - vocals
 Paul Ward - bass and acoustic guitar on "Take Me Back" and "Ole Slewfoot"
 David Holmes - drums on "Let's Play Schools" and "Nigel Pringle"
 Debbie Grech - backing vocals

References 

1979 albums
Polydor Records albums